The women's 800 metre freestyle event at the 2008 Olympic Games took place on 14 and 16 August at the Beijing National Aquatics Center in Beijing, China.

Great Britain's Rebecca Adlington broke one of the oldest world records in the book to claim a second Olympic gold, following her first triumph in the 400 m freestyle. She touched the wall first in 8:14.10, slashing 2.12-second deficit off Janet Evans' world record which had stood for nearly 19 years.

Coming from sixth place in the 350-metre lap, Italy's Alessia Filippi registered a time of 8:20.23 for a silver medal. Lotte Friis ended Denmark's 20-year medal drought in swimming to claim a bronze in 8:23.03, edging out Romania's Camelia Potec (8:23.03) on the final lap by eight-hundredths of a second. China's Li Xuanxu finished fifth with a time of 8:26.34, and was followed in the sixth spot by Australia's Kylie Palmer in 8:26.39. Russia's Yelena Sokolova (8:29.79) and another Brit Cassandra Patten (8:32.35) rounded out the finale. Notable swimmers missed out the top 8 final featuring U.S. top favorites Katie Hoff and Kate Ziegler, both of whom placed tenth and eleventh in the prelims race.

Earlier in the prelims, Adlington established a new Olympic standard in a top-seeded time of 8:18.06 to cut down Brooke Bennett's 2000 record by a 1.59-second deficit.

Records
Prior to this competition, the existing world and Olympic records were as follows.

The following new world and Olympic records were set during this competition.

Results

Heats

Final

References

External links
Official Olympic Report

Women's freestyle 800 metre
2008 in women's swimming
Women's events at the 2008 Summer Olympics